Lázaro Blanco Fuentes (April 1, 1938 – May 4, 2011) was a Mexican photographer.

Blanco was born in Ciudad Juárez, Chihuahua, Mexico.  He directed the Casa del Lago Photography Workshop in Mexico City from 1968 until his death.

Blanco's work has been shown in numerous galleries.

External links 
 Bio and photos
 2010 exhibition data
 Obituary

1938 births
2011 deaths
Mexican photographers